Christian August Crusius (10 January 1715 – 18 October 1775) was a German philosopher and Protestant theologian.

Biography
Crusius was born in Leuna in the Electorate of Saxony. He was educated at the University of Leipzig, and became professor of theology there in 1750, and principal in 1773.

Crusius first came to notice as an opponent of the philosophy of Gottfried Leibniz and Christian Wolff from the standpoint of religious orthodoxy. He attacked it mainly on the grounds of the moral evils that must flow from any system of determinism, and attempted to vindicate the freedom of the will. The most important works of this period of his life are Anweisung, vernünftig zu leben [Guide to Rational Living] (1744), Entwurf der nothwendigen Vernunftwahrheiten wiefern sie den zufälligen entgegengesetzt werden [Outline of the Necessary Truths of Reason, in so far as they are Opposed to Contingent Truths] (1745), Weg zur Gewissheit und Zuverlässigkeit der menschlichen Erkenntniss [Path to Certainty and Reliability in Human Knowledge] (1747), and Anleitung, über natürliche Begebenheiten ordentlich und vorsichtig nachzudenken [Instruction on How to Reflect Correctly and Cautiously on Natural Events] (1749). Crusius' philosophical books had a great but short-lived popularity. His criticism of Wolff influenced Immanuel Kant at the time when his system was forming; and his ethical, as well as epistemological, doctrines are cited in his habilitation thesis and the Critique of Practical Reason.  Kant "was deeply influenced by Crusius" and owned Anweisung, Entwurf, and Anleitung.

Crusius's later life was devoted to theology. He led the party in the university which became known as the "Crusianer" as opposed to the "Ernestianer," the followers of JA Ernesti. The two professors adopted opposite methods of exegesis. Ernesti wished to subject the Scripture in the same way as other ancient books; Crusius held firmly to orthodox ecclesiastical tradition.

He died in Leipzig.

Philosophical work
Crusius's chief theological works are Hypomnemata ad theologiam propheticam (1764–78), and Kurzer Entwurf den Moraltheologie (Short Outline of Moral Theology; 1772–73); his most important philosophical work is Entwurf der notwendingen Venunftwahrheiten reprinted Darmstadt: Wissenschaftliche Buchgesellschaft, 1963. He opposed innovation in such matters as the accepted authorship of canonical writings, verbal inspiration, and the treatment of persons and events in the Old Testament as types of the New. His views have influenced later evangelical students of the Old Testament, such as EW Hengstenberg and Franz Delitzsch.

There is a full notice of Crusius in Ersch and Gruber's Allgemeine Encyclopädie. See also JE Erdmann's History of Philosophy; Anton Marquardt, Kant und Crusius; and article in Herzog-Hauck, Realencyklopädie (1898).

Notes

References
 Crusius, Christian August.Die philosophische Hauptwerke, edited by Giorgio Tonelli, Hildesheim: Georg Olms, 1964 (four volumes).
 Tonelli, Giorgio. "Crusius, Christian August" in Paul Edwards, The Encyclopedia of Philosophy, New York: Macmillan, 1967, vol. 2, pp. 268–271.

External links
 The Birth of Ontology. A selection of Ontologists from 1560 to 1770
 Entwurf der nothwendigen Vernunftwahrheiten 3rd edition (1766)

1715 births
1775 deaths
People from Leuna
People from the Electorate of Saxony
18th-century German Protestant theologians
18th-century German philosophers
Leipzig University alumni
Academic staff of Leipzig University
German male non-fiction writers
18th-century German male writers